Lily Luik (born 14 October 1985) is an Estonian long-distance runner. She competed in the marathon event at the 2015 World Championships in Athletics in Beijing, China.

She is one of an identical triplet, sister of Liina and Leila. All three qualified to participate in the marathon event representing Estonia at the 2016 Summer Olympics in Rio de Janeiro. The triplets were professional dancers before Liina brought them to running.

References

1985 births
Living people
Estonian female long-distance runners
Estonian female marathon runners
World Athletics Championships athletes for Estonia
Place of birth missing (living people)
Triplets
Athletes (track and field) at the 2016 Summer Olympics
Olympic athletes of Estonia